Michel Mulder (born 27 February 1986) is a Dutch speed skater. He is the 2014 Olympic Champion at the 500 m distance and 2014 Olympic bronze medalist at the 1,000 m distance. He finished second in the men's 500 metres event at the 2012 World Single Distance Speed Skating Championships. His twin brother, Ronald Mulder, is also a speed skater. Despite being the defending champion for the 500m distance at the Olympic Games, Michel did not qualify for the 2018 Olympics. His twin brother competed in the event and finished in 7th place.

Personal records

Source: SpeedskatingResults.com

See also
List of Olympic medalist families

References

External links 
 
 
 
 

1986 births
Dutch male speed skaters
Speed skaters at the 2014 Winter Olympics
Olympic speed skaters of the Netherlands
Medalists at the 2014 Winter Olympics
Olympic medalists in speed skating
Olympic gold medalists for the Netherlands
Olympic bronze medalists for the Netherlands
Sportspeople from Zwolle
Dutch twins
Living people
Twin sportspeople
World Single Distances Speed Skating Championships medalists
World Sprint Speed Skating Championships medalists
Competitors at the 2017 World Games
20th-century Dutch people
21st-century Dutch people